Manfred Kupferschmied (born 10 November 1941 in Brüx) is a retired German footballer, who was as a football manager in East Germany.

References

External links

1941 births
Living people
FC Energie Cottbus players
East German footballers
German football managers
FC Energie Cottbus managers
Chemnitzer FC managers
Association football midfielders
FSV Zwickau managers
Sportspeople from Most (city)
People from Sudetenland
Sudeten German people